"Matter of Life and Death" is the second episode of the first series of Space: 1999.  The screenplay was written by Art Wallace and Johnny Byrne; the director was Charles Crichton.  The original title was "Siren Planet".  The final shooting script is dated 8 January 1974.  Live-action filming took place Monday 14 January 1974 through Wednesday 30 January 1974.

Story 

The Moon enters a new solar system on a path that will carry it close to a habitable planet.  With the hope this could be the end of their captive journey, the Moonbase Alpha staff assigns the planet the code-name 'Terra Nova'—New Earth.  As per the first phase of the Operation Exodus colonisation protocol, Eagle One is sent on a low-altitude reconnaissance.  While the staff awaits its return, preliminary data from the on-board computer is processed and confirms the planet has unlimited resources to sustain human life.  Astronauts Parks and Bannion check in, marveling over the planet's similarity to Earth; with no sign of intelligent life, it seems to be waiting just for them.

Contact is broken when the ship is struck by an energy bolt snaking up from the planet surface.  Before visual contact is lost, both men react as though being electrocuted.  For a brief moment there is no communication from the ship, then flight status and medical telemetry transmissions resume—but no word from the pilots.  The Eagle proceeds under automatic pilot and John Koenig orders preparations for an emergency touchdown.  As the ship comes in for a landing, there is still no contact.

The Commander signals a red alert and goes to meet the ship with the medical team.  The two pilots are found alive, but unconscious.  A search of the ship turns up a third person in the passenger module.  Helena Russell examines this unexpected casualty.  After turning his head to look into his face, the doctor freezes, announcing in a shocked whisper that this is her husband—who died five years ago.

Lee Russell was medical officer on the Astro 7 mission.  In 1994, the ill-fated exploratory vessel arrived at Jupiter and became trapped in orbit.  When contact was lost, the ship was believed to have been burned up by that planet's intense radiation.  In spite of the uncountable billions of miles they have travelled from their solar system, Helena is certain this man is her husband.  Adding to the mystery, the electronic monitors in the care unit do not register his vital signs.

While Helena maintains a vigil at her husband's bedside, a command conference is convened.  While the executive staff cannot explain the mysterious stowaway, the overriding topic of discussion is Terra Nova and the next phase of Operation Exodus:  a manned survey of the surface.  Koenig insists on caution, delaying the launch of the Phase Two probe by ten hours.  Ignoring a barrage of protests, Koenig is resolute; he wants answers to the enigma of Russell before jeopardising any more lives.

Koenig later meets with Victor Bergman, who is at a loss as to why their instruments cannot record Russell's life signs.  The professor can only speculate that it is a side effect of his body having adapted to exist in an alien environment.  As for Koenig's other questions—such as how Russell boarded a ship in flight, and who or what affected the crew—only Russell himself has the answers.  The Commander orders him brought out of his unconscious state with metrazine, a powerful stimulant.  Helena protests, but relents when he reminds her they will be in range of Terra Nova for only three more days.  The fate of the three hundred men and women on Alpha rests on the information Russell can provide.

The injection is administered and Russell awakens.  He is barely coherent and will not speak with anyone but his wife.  When left alone with Helena, he is suddenly lucid.  She tells him of their predicament and how they came to be trapped on the runaway Moon.  When she expresses her hope of settling on his planet, he becomes greatly disturbed.  He takes her by the shoulders—and she is thrust across the room by the electric shock he dispenses.  Both are rendered unconscious by this act.  Later, Koenig visits the recovering Helena in her quarters, but there is little for her to tell; she has no memory of why she passed out or what Russell revealed when he spoke.

Bergman presents him with another anomaly.  Three thermographic x-rays of Lee Russell are displayed in the professor's quarters-cum-laboratory.  The first and third films show the normal temperature profile of a living man.  These were taken when Helena was present.  The second, taken in her absence, recorded no appreciable body heat—despite his having appeared to be alive and well at the time.  When viewed as a whole, the series does not represent the metabolism of a normal man.  Koenig is stumped; human physiology could never adapt this radically in just five years.  Bermgan reminds him they are travelling through an incomprehensible universe; Earth-based logic and laws of nature no longer apply.

They conclude that Russell is somehow linked with Helena and the life-force sustaining his body is being drawn from her.  The viewer is given a demonstration of this unnatural fact as, for a brief time, any motion made by Russell—sitting up in bed, touching his face, flexing his fingers—is duplicated by Helena in her quarters.  Russell then gets out of bed, crosses to a mirror and is transfixed by his reflection.  He demands to see Helena, but Bob Mathias tries to steer him back to bed.  Raging, Russell swats the doctor across the room and Security is summoned to restrain him.  Only Helena's arrival calms him down.

Russell is taken to Koenig's office for interrogation.  He claims to know neither how he arrived on the planet nor how long he has lived there.  While he seems to have difficulty vocalising his thoughts, he can tell them they are in danger.  The planet is inhabited, but not in a manner they would understand or recognise.  If they land there, they will face power beyond understanding—their 'opposite'—which will annihilate them.  When he realises they will go despite his warning, he sits, whispers Helena's name (a farewell or a severance of their link?) and quietly dies.  Later, Koenig pays his respects to Helena, who tells him these events have left her numb.  She has come to the painful realisation that Lee Russell never really returned.

With time running out, Koenig is now impatient to launch the Phase Two survey.  He rejects Bergman's advice to wait for the results of Russell's autopsy.  He does agree to allow the professor one hour to run tests on skin samples taken from the dead man.  Preparations for the survey Eagle are nearly completed when Bergman gives his report.  While 'alive', Russell's skin cells appeared normal; after death, the particle analyser shows their atomic structure is changing, reversing polarity.  This is the first step toward a conversion to antimatter.  The professor's warning is plain—should matter and antimatter meet, they will annihilate each other in a catastrophic release of energy.

Koenig scoffs at this speculative evidence and orders Eagle Two launched immediately.  He, Helena, Alan Carter, Paul Morrow and Sandra Benes will comprise the crew.  He orders Bergman to remain on Alpha and, if things go wrong, to assume command.  As they board, Mathias begins the autopsy.  When making contact with Russell, an electrical discharge throws the doctor across the pathology unit.  When rising from the floor, he sees the cadaver has vanished.  Bergman calls Koenig with this news and, with the threat of encountering antimatter, implores him to abort the mission.  Koenig refuses and lifts off.

They touch down on Terra Nova.  When readings confirm an Earth-type environment, the survey party steps out onto the lush, fertile landscape.  They separate into teams of two, with Carter remaining to guard the ship.  Koenig and Helena set off into the woods and soon come across a pond surrounded by fruit trees.  After remote analysis shows both water and produce to be safe for human consumption, they decide to sample the native fare.  Bergman and the Main Mission staff are delighted by the visuals the pair transmits of their impromptu picnic.

A short while later, Bergman calls with alarming news:  all the Moonbase atmosphere seals are inexplicably melting.  The problem even extends to their Eagle.  Knowing he pushed their luck too far, Koenig cancels the expedition.  Carter calls in his own sit-rep that the Eagle's insulation panels are emitting heavy smoke.  He tries to abandon ship, but the failure of the auto-systems has jammed the doors.  Hurrying back, Koenig and Helena encounter Morrow and Sandra.  As Morrow runs, a sample case he carries knocks against his holstered stun-gun—which explodes.  Morrow is killed and Sandra left blind.  Helena tends to the hysterical girl as Koenig watches the Eagle explode.

Bergman calls to convey the rapidly deteriorating conditions on Alpha.  After his signal cuts out, Koenig's attention is directed skyward by a terrified Helena.  As they watch, the Moon is blown apart by a tremendous explosion.  The blast wave from the exploding Moon rolls across the planet surface.  Koenig leads the women in search of shelter, but they are overwhelmed by hurricane-force winds ripping through the forest.  Sandra is instantly lost in the confusion.  Unable to find her, Koenig and Helena find marginal shelter in a shallow depression under a steep slope.  Looking up, he sees a rockslide bearing down on them.  Koenig is pummeled by heavy debris as he protects Helena with his body.

After the wind dies, Helena emerges to find Koenig dying.  Before she can do anything, he is gone.  She looks over the devastation that was once an idyllic woodland and breaks down, sobbing.  She is brought up short by a hand touching her shoulder, more so when she sees it belongs to Lee Russell.  He had hoped she would heed his warning, he says, but he was unable to fully transition back to her world to articulate the danger.  What he is now was once her husband, but the Astro 7 crew was transformed by an unknown form of radiation.   He ended up on this planet, the opposite of his former self—antimatter, by her definition.

He tells her she must leave immediately; if she remains, the destruction will continue and get much worse.  She begs him for help and he embraces her, telling her to see what she wants to see.  Sharing in his power, time rolls back and the world around her reverts to its former splendour.  Koenig and the others are alive, the Eagle is waiting, and Alpha and the Moon are intact.  She tells Koenig they cannot stay, and the Commander cancels Operation Exodus.

The survey party returns to Alpha.  Koenig is stopped by David Kano, who informs him that the feasibility programmes being run on Computer indicate the Moon's present trajectory should carry them past some ten million planets.  Statistically, 3,600 of those planets should be habitable—but it will take over 2,500 years to see them all.  His spirits raised by Kano's enthusiasm, he joins Helena on the observation balcony as she watches Terra Nova receding into the distance.  As the Moon speeds off into space, she bids her husband a final, silent farewell...

Cast

Starring 
 Martin Landau — Commander John Koenig
 Barbara Bain — Doctor Helena Russell

Also starring 
 Barry Morse — Professor Victor Bergman

Guest artist 
 Richard Johnson — Lee Russell

Featuring 
 Prentis Hancock — Controller Paul Morrow
 Clifton Jones — David Kano
 Zienia Merton — Sandra Benes
 Anton Phillips — Doctor Bob Mathias
 Nick Tate — Captain Alan Carter
 Stuart Damon — Astronaut Parks

Uncredited artists 
 Suzanne Roquette — Tanya
 John Oxley — Astronaut Bannion
 Tony Allyn — Security Guard One
 Quentin Pierre — Security Guard Two
 Barbara Kelly — Computer Voice

Music 
An original score was composed for this episode by Barry Gray.  The electric guitar solo track played while Lee Russell goes berserk was conceived and performed by Sylvia Anderson's son-in-law, musician Vic Elms.  A music track from the Gerry Anderson film Thunderbirds Are Go also composed by Gray was utilised.  With production delays plaguing the premiere episode, "Breakaway", the music for this segment was the first to be composed and recorded.

Production notes 
 When Irish author and poet Johnny Byrne was hired for six weeks to quickly produce shootable material for the series (which had gone into production with only one completed script—its premiere episode, "Breakaway"), he was handed a screenplay from American television writer Art Wallace entitled "Siren Planet".  With the script written for an earlier format of the series, Bryne was forced to do a complete re-write.  Byrne reconceived the story as a science-fiction mystery, retaining as its core concept the return of Helena's dead husband and adding the threat of antimatter.  Completed in two weeks, it was this script that convinced story consultant Christopher Penfold to bring Byrne on staff full-time.
 The original material seemed to be more of an homage to the 1970 novel Solaris by Polish author Stanislaw Lem, with facsimiles of the staff's dead relatives appearing on Alpha to prevent their landing on the planet.  Rather than give warning, aliens in the guise of Helena's late husband (named Telford Russell at this point) and, in the climax, Koenig's late father would use deception and trickery to manipulate the Alphans.
 Zienia Merton recalls when reading the script, she was expected to sweep a large spider off the shoulder of Prentis Hancock's character Morrow.  Suffering from arachnophobia, she panicked and stormed the office of producer Sylvia Anderson.  Taking in Merton's agitated state, Anderson jumped to conclusions and asked if she was pregnant. Fortunately, the real problem was easily solved with a minor re-write of the script:  Hancock's character was killed and Merton's blinded.
 This episode introduced the character of David Kano, head of the Technical Section and resident computer expert, played by Clifton Jones.  Jones had been brought in quickly to replace actor Lon Satton, who had proved unpopular with the cast during the filming of "Breakaway"; the shooting script still contained his character's name, Benjamin Ouma.

Novelisation 
The episode was adapted in the first Year One Space: 1999 novel Breakaway by E. C. Tubb, published in 1975.  Tubb made several significant changes to fit the story into the narrative of his novel: (1) As this story immediately follows "Breakaway", Meta and Terra Nova are made the same planet.  This adds another mystery to the story, as how could a rogue planet far beyond the warmth of the sun maintain a shirt-sleeve environment; (2) Lee Russell is a representative of the alien race, masquerading as Helena's dead husband to gain her trust; (3) The deaths of Koenig and company, the destruction of Terra Nova and the Moon, and Lee Russell's miraculous act of restoration are explained away as a bad 'trip'; the fruit Helena sampled is discovered to contain hallucinogenic compounds and is presented as a more logical explanation for the events concluding the story.

References

External links 
Space: 1999 - "Matter of Life and Death" - The Catacombs episode guide
Space: 1999 - "Matter of Life and Death" - Moonbase Alpha's Space: 1999 page

1975 British television episodes
Space: 1999 episodes